The Jewish Naturalisation Act 1753 was an Act of Parliament (26 Geo. 2, c. 26) of the Parliament of Great Britain, which received royal assent on 7 July 1753 but was repealed in 1754 (27 Geo 2, c. 1) due to widespread opposition to its provisions.

History
During the Jacobite rising of 1745, the Jews had shown particular loyalty to the government. Their chief financier, Sampson Gideon, had strengthened the stock market, and several of the younger members had volunteered in the corps raised to defend London. Possibly as a reward, Henry Pelham in 1753 brought in the Jew Bill of 1753, which allowed Jews to become naturalised by application to Parliament. It passed the Lords without much opposition, but on being brought down to the House of Commons, the Tories made protest against what they deemed an "abandonment of Christianity." The Whigs, however, persisted in carrying out at least one part of their general policy of religious toleration, and the bill was passed and received royal assent (26 Geo. II., cap. 26).  The public reacted with an enormous outburst of antisemitism, and the Bill was repealed in the next sitting of Parliament, in 1754.

Horace Walpole, a contemporary observer, said that the Act removed "such absurd distinctions, as stigmatized and shackled a body of the most loyal, commercial and wealthy subjects of the kingdom"; the affair demonstrated that "the age, enlightened as it is called, was still enslaved to the grossest and most vulgar prejudices". The political economist Josiah Tucker defended the Act in A Letter to A Friend Concerning Naturalizations (1753), where he pointed to the economic benefits of granting naturalisation to Jewish people:

As to the Bill itself, it only empowers rich Foreigners to purchase Lands, and to carry on a free and extensive Commerce, by importing all Sorts of Merchandise and Raw Materials, allowed by Law to be imported, for the Employment of our own People, and then Exporting the Surplus of the Produce, Labour, and Manufactures of our own Country, upon cheaper and better Terms than is done at present. This is all the Hurt that such a Bill can do.Alan H. Singer, 'Great Britain or Judea Nova? National Identity, Property, and the Jewish Naturalization Controversy of 1753', in Sheila A. Spector (ed.), British Romanticism and the Jews: History, Culture, Literature (London: Palgrave Macmillan, 2002), p. 32.

German Jews
While the Sephardim chiefly congregated in London as the centre of international commerce, Jews immigrating from Germany and Poland settled for the most part in the seaports of the south and west, such as Falmouth, Plymouth, Liverpool, Bristol, etc., as pawnbrokers and small dealers. From these centres it became their custom to send out hawkers every Monday with packs to the neighbouring villages, whereby connections were made with some of the inland towns, where they began to settle, such as Canterbury, Chatham, Cambridge, Manchester, and Birmingham. Traders of this type, while not of such prominence as the larger merchants of the capital, came in closer contact with ordinary English people and may have helped to allay some of the prejudice which had been manifested so strongly in 1753.

See also
History of the Jews in England
History of the Jews in England (1066–1290) 
Edict of Expulsion
History of the Marranos in England
Resettlement of the Jews in England
Menasseh Ben Israel (1604–1657)
Emancipation of the Jews in the United Kingdom
Early English Jewish literature
Rothschild family
History of the Jews in Scotland

References

Further reading
 Crome, Andrew. "The 1753 ‘Jew Bill’ Controversy: Jewish Restoration to Palestine, Biblical Prophecy, and English National Identity." English Historical Review 130.547 (2015): 1449-1478 online
Katz, David S. Philo-Semitism and the Readmission of the Jews to England, 1603-1655 (Oxford: Oxford University Press, 1982)
Katz, David S. The Jews in the History of England, 1485-1850 (Oxford: Oxford University Press, 1994)
 Rabin, Dana Y. "The Jew Bill of 1753: Masculinity, virility, and the nation." Eighteenth-century studies 39.2 (2006): 157–171.
 Yuval-Naeh, Avinoam. "The 1753 Jewish Naturalization Bill and the Polemic over Credit." Journal of British Studies 57.3 (2018): 467-492. online

External links
The text of the act.
England-related articles in the Jewish Encyclopedia

Great Britain Acts of Parliament 1753
British nationality law
Immigration law in the United Kingdom
Jewish English history
Sephardi Jews topics
Repealed Great Britain Acts of Parliament